Michael MacConnell is an Australian author, whose first novel, Maelstrom, was released in October 2007 by Hachette Livre. The sequel Splinter followed in July 2008. Both have been published in the United Kingdom, Germany, Australia and New Zealand. He is a member of the International Thriller Writers Organization. An avid reader of crime and thriller fiction since he was a child, some of his writing influences have been David Morrell, Raymond E. Feist, Alex Kava, Daniel Silva, Dean Koontz, Lee Child, Michael Cordy, and Steven Pressfield. Maelstrom made the Ned Kelly Award long list in the Best Debut Novel category.

Novels
Maelstrom (2007)
Splinter (2008)

1973 births
Living people
21st-century Australian novelists
Australian male novelists
21st-century Australian male writers